Natal is a microregion in the Brazilian state of Rio Grande do Norte.

Municipalities 
The microregion consists of the following municipalities:
 Extremoz
 Natal
 Parnamirim

References

Microregions of Rio Grande do Norte